Chersonesia risa, the common maplet, is a butterfly of the family Nymphalidae. It is found in South-East Asia.

Subspecies
Chersonesia risa risa (Assam to Peninsular Malaya)
Chersonesia risa transies (Martin, 1903) (northern Indo-China and possibly China)
Chersonesia risa cyanee (de Nicéville, [1893]) (Borneo)

References

External links
Images representing Chersoneia risa at Consortium for the Barcode of Life

Cyrestinae
Butterflies described in 1848
Butterflies of Borneo